Francesco Mastriani (1819–1891) was an Italian novelist. Mastriani wrote in a variety of genres. One of his most successful was The Blind Woman of Sorrento (1852). In the twentieth century a number of his novels were turned into films.

References

Bibliography 
 Mayer, Geoff. Historical Dictionary of Crime Films. Scarecrow Press, 2012. google books

External links 
 

1819 births
1891 deaths
Italian male writers
19th-century Neapolitan people